Fiber crops are field crops grown for their fibers, which are traditionally used to make paper, cloth, or rope.

Fiber crops are characterized by having a large concentration of cellulose, which is what gives them their strength. The fibers may be chemically modified, like in viscose (used to make rayon and cellophane). In recent years, materials scientists have begun exploring further use of these fibers in composite materials. Due to cellulose being the main factor of a plant fiber's strength, this is what scientists are looking to manipulate to create different types of fibers.

Fiber crops are generally harvestable after a single growing season, as distinct from trees, which are typically grown for many years before being harvested for such materials as wood pulp fiber or lacebark. In specific circumstances, fiber crops can be superior to wood pulp fiber in terms of technical performance, environmental impact or cost.

There are a number of issues regarding the use of fiber crops to make pulp. One of these is seasonal availability.  While trees can be harvested continuously, many field crops are harvested once during the year and must be stored such that the crop doesn't rot over a period of many months. Considering that many pulp mills require several thousand tonnes of fiber source per day, storage of the fiber source can be a major issue.

Botanically, the fibers harvested from many of these plants are bast fibers; the fibers come from the phloem tissue of the plant. The other fiber crop fibers are hard/leaf fibers (come from the entirety of plant vascular bundles) and surface fibers (come from plant epidermal tissue).

Fiber sources

Before the industrialisation of the paper production the most common fiber source was recycled fibers from used textiles, called rags. The rags were from ramie, hemp, linen and cotton. A process for removing printing inks from recycled paper was invented by German jurist Justus Claproth in 1774. Today this method is called deinking. It was not until the introduction of wood pulp in 1843 that paper production was not dependent on recycled materials from ragpickers.

To have a source of fiber to utilize in production, the fiber first must be extracted from the plant. This is done in different ways depending on the fiber classification. Bast fibers are harvested through retting which is where microbes are utilized to remove soft tissues from the plant and only the useful fibrous material remains. Hard fibers are harvested mainly through decortication which is where the non-fibrous tissues are removed by hand or machine. Lastly, surface fibers are harvested through ginning which is where a machine removes the fibers from other plant material.

Fiber crops

 Bast fibers 
 Ramie, fiber plants grow along Chang Jiang river, edible with anti bacteria function.
(Stem-skin fibers)
 Esparto, a fiber from a grass
 Jute, widely used, it is the cheapest fiber after cotton
 Flax, produce linen
 Indian hemp, the Dogbane used by Native Americans
 Hemp, a soft, strong fiber, edible seeds
 Hoopvine, also used for barrel hoops and baskets, edible leaves, medicine
 Kenaf, the interior of the plant stem is used for its fiber. Edible leaves.
Beans, an edible seed, typically kidney-shaped, growing in long pods on certain leguminous plants.
 Linden bast
 Lotus, used to produce lotus silk
 Nettles
 Ramie, a nettle, stronger than cotton or flax, makes "China grass cloth"
 Papyrus, a pith fiber, akin to a bast fiber
 Leaf fibers
 Abacá, a banana, producing "manila" rope from leaves
 Piña, from pineapple leaves
 Sisal, an agave
 Bowstring hemp, a common house plant, also Sansevieria roxburghiana, Sansevieria hyacinthoides
 Henequen, an agave. A useful fiber, but not as high quality as sisal
 Phormium, “New Zealand Flax”
 Yucca, an agave relative
 Seed fibers and fruit fibers
 Coir, the fiber from the coconut husk
 Cotton
 Kapok
 Milkweed, grown for the filament-like pappus in its seed pods
 Luffa, a gourd which when mature produces a sponge-like mass of xylem, used to make loofa sponge
Walissima is a natural plant fiber obtained from Sida rhombifolia of Malvaceae family. It was produced mainly in Philippines islands.
 Other fibers (leaf, fruit, and other fibers)

References

External links
Waynesword Plant Fibers  Accessed 2010-11-23